"My Gun" is a song recorded by Australian alternative rock group the Rubens. It was released on 4 August 2012 as the third single from their debut album, The Rubens.

The track won Rock Work of the Year at the 2013 APRA Music Awards as well as being nominated for Best Video at the ARIA Music Awards of 2012, but lost out to "Everyone's Waiting" by Missy Higgins.

The track was voted in at number 10 on Triple J's Hottest 100 of 2012.

Music video
The music video was directed by Josh Logue and released on 12 August 2012.

Track listing
One-track single
 My Gun" – 3:10

US four-track single
 "My Gun" – 3:10
 "Lay It Down" – 3:51
 "Don't Ever Want to Be Found" – 3:19
 "The Best We Got" – 3:55

Charts

Weekly charts

Year-end charts

Certification

References

2012 songs
2012 singles
APRA Award winners
The Rubens songs
Song recordings produced by David Kahne